Gökçen is a town in İzmir Province, Turkey

Geography
It is situated in bottom land and along a tributary of Büyük Menderes River. The population of Gökçen  is 2499 as of 2011

History 
The area around the town was inhabited during the Lydian era (6th century BC and before) age. But the town of Gökçen was established in 1957 by merging two villages. Both of villages were Aydınoğlu villages in the 14th century. (Aydınoğlu or Aydın was a Turkmen beylik later merged to Ottoman Empire) One was called Fetih (later Fata) and the other  Karaehat (later Kahrat) The new name Gökçen refers to Gökçen Efe a folk  hero of Turkish War of Independence, who fell in Fata in 1919.

Economy 
Cattle breeding is the most important economic sector of the town. Olives and various fruits are among the main agricultural crops. There is also a tomato sauce factory  and a sand quarry in the town.

References

Populated places in İzmir Province
Towns in Turkey
Tire District